In mathematics, intersection theory is one of the main branches of algebraic geometry, where it gives information about the intersection of two subvarieties of a given variety. The theory for varieties is older, with roots in Bézout's theorem on curves and elimination theory. On the other hand, the topological theory more quickly reached a definitive form.

There is yet an ongoing development of intersection theory. Currently the main focus is on: virtual fundamental cycles, quantum intersection rings, Gromov-Witten theory and the extension of intersection theory from schemes to stacks.

Topological intersection form

Stated precisely, there is a bilinear form

given by

with

These can be referred to uniformly as ε-symmetric forms, where  respectively for symmetric and skew-symmetric forms. It is possible in some circumstances to refine this form to an -quadratic form, though this requires additional data such as a framing of the tangent bundle. It is possible to drop the orientability condition and work with  coefficients instead.

These forms are important topological invariants. For example, a theorem of Michael Freedman states that simply connected compact 4-manifolds are (almost) determined by their intersection forms up to homeomorphism.

By Poincaré duality, it turns out that there is a way to think of this geometrically. This explains the terminology intersection form.

Intersection theory in algebraic geometry
William Fulton in Intersection Theory (1984) writes

Two extreme cases have been most familiar. If the intersection is proper, i.e.

To give a definition, in the general case, of the intersection multiplicity was the major concern of André Weil's 1946 book Foundations of Algebraic Geometry. Work in the 1920s of B. L. van der Waerden had already addressed the question; in the Italian school of algebraic geometry the ideas were well known, but foundational questions were not addressed in the same spirit.

Moving cycles
A well-working machinery of intersecting algebraic cycles  and  requires more than taking just the set-theoretic intersection  of the cycles in question. If the two cycles are in "good position" then the intersection product, denoted , should consist of the set-theoretic intersection of the two subvarieties. However cycles may be in bad position, e.g. two parallel lines in the plane, or a plane containing a line (intersecting in 3-space). In both cases the intersection should be a point, because, again, if one cycle is moved, this would be the intersection.

Therefore, the concept of moving cycles using appropriate equivalence relations on algebraic cycles is used.

For the purposes of intersection theory, rational equivalence is the most important one. Briefly, two -dimensional cycles on a variety  are rationally equivalent if there is a rational function  on a -dimensional subvariety , i.e. an element of the function field  or equivalently a function , such that , where  is counted with multiplicities. Rational equivalence accomplishes the needs sketched above.

Intersection multiplicities

The guiding principle in the definition of intersection multiplicities of cycles is continuity in a certain sense. Consider the following elementary example: the intersection of a parabola  and an axis  should be , because if one of the cycles moves (yet in an undefined sense), there are precisely two intersection points which both converge to  when the cycles approach the depicted position. (The picture is misleading insofar as the apparently empty intersection of the parabola and the line  is empty, because only the real solutions of the equations are depicted).

The first fully satisfactory definition of intersection multiplicities was given by Serre: Let the ambient variety  be smooth (or all local rings regular). Further let  and  be two (irreducible reduced closed) subvarieties, such that their intersection is proper. Let  be an irreducible component of the set-theoretic intersection  and  its generic point.

This expression is sometimes referred to as Serre's Tor-formula.

Remarks:
The first summand, the length of 
 
is the "naive" guess of the multiplicity; however, as Serre shows, it is not sufficient.
The sum is finite, because the regular local ring  has finite Tor-dimension.
If it is proper, it is strictly positive. (Both statements are not obvious from the definition).
Using a spectral sequence argument, it can be shown that .

The Chow ring

The Chow ring is the group of algebraic cycles modulo rational equivalence together with the following commutative intersection product:

whenever V and W meet transversely, where  is the decomposition of the set-theoretic intersection into irreducible components.

Self-intersection

Given, for instance, a curve  on a surface , its intersection with itself (as sets) is just itself: . This is clearly correct, but on the other hand unsatisfactory: given any two distinct curves on a surface (with no component in common), they intersect in some set of points, which for instance one can count, obtaining an intersection number, and we may wish to do the same for a given curve: the analogy is that intersecting distinct curves is like multiplying two numbers: , while self-intersection is like squaring a single number: . Formally, the analogy is stated as a symmetric bilinear form (multiplication) and a quadratic form (squaring).

A geometric solution to this is to intersect the curve  not with itself, but with a slightly pushed off version of itself.

Alternatively, one can “solve” (or motivate) this problem algebraically by dualizing, and looking at the class of  – this both gives a number, and raises the question of a geometric interpretation. Note that passing to cohomology classes is analogous to replacing a curve by a linear system.

Note that the self-intersection number can be negative, as the example below illustrates.

Examples
In terms of intersection forms, we say the plane has one of type  (there is only one class of lines, and they all intersect with each other).

Note that on the affine plane, one might push off  to a parallel line, so (thinking geometrically) the number of intersection points depends on the choice of push-off. One says that “the affine plane does not have a good intersection theory”, and intersection theory on non-projective varieties is much more difficult.

(It is a ruled surface.) In terms of intersection forms, we say  has one of type   – there are two basic classes of lines, which intersect each other in one point, but have zero self-intersection (no  or  terms).

Blow-ups
A key example of self-intersection numbers is the exceptional curve of a blow-up, which is a central operation in birational geometry. Given an algebraic surface , blowing up at a point creates a curve . (This is not obvious.) In fact, Castelnuovo’s contraction theorem states the converse: every -curve is the exceptional curve of some blow-up (it can be “blown down”).

See also
 Chow group
 Grothendieck–Riemann–Roch theorem
 Enumerative geometry

Citations

References

Bibliography